National Route 40 is a national highway in South Korea connects Dangjin to Gongju. It established on 14 March 1981

Main stopovers
South Chungcheong
Dangjin- Yesan County- Hongseong County- Boryeong- Buyeo County- Gongju

Major intersections 

IC: Interchange

References

40
Roads in South Chungcheong